God Doesn't Mean You Get To Live Forever is a gospel stage play written by trombonist Gregory Charles Royal. The play features musicians as principal actors. It ran Off Broadway in New York's Broadway Theater District and the Schomburg Center for Research in Black Culture

During the first mounting of the production, the cast included of Kenneth "Skillet" Crutchfield in the role of "Pasa Skillet" (Pastor), Royal in the role of "Q", vocalist Robbie Love in the lead role of "Reese", John B. Ross in the Role of the "Deacon", and Zarin Veres Royal in the role of "Melanie".

In December 2012, the production was mounted again as a series of performances in New York at the Baruch Performing Arts Center starring Gregory Charles Royal, Frenchie Davis (in the role of "Reese Noel") and The Reverend Dr. James A. Forbes Jr. as himself.

God Doesn't Mean You Get To Live Forever delves into the notion that belief in God may not translate into the eventuality of everlasting life and the conflict such a notion brings upon a gospel musician, "Q."

References 
 

2012 plays
2012 musicals
American plays